Morelli Glacier is a glacier in the western part of King Peninsula, Antarctica,  southeast of Cape Waite, draining northeast to Abbot Ice Shelf in Peacock Sound. It was mapped by the United States Geological Survey from surveys and U.S. Navy air photos, 1960–66, and was named by the Advisory Committee on Antarctic Names for Panfilo S. Morelli, a glaciologist at Byrd Station in 1961–62.

See also
 List of glaciers in the Antarctic
 Glaciology

References

 

Glaciers of Ellsworth Land